The TRG-230 is a guided surface-to-surface missile of 230-mm diameter designed and manufactured by Turkish company Roketsan. TRG-230 missiles have a range of 20 km to 70 km and are launched from 230-mm rocket tubes. The TRLG-230 variant has laser guidance and its range has been extended to 150 km.

Synopsis
The TRG-230 missile is designed to be used against high-priority targets within a range of 20–70 km. It can be launched from the Roketsan Multi-Barrel Rocket Launcher and other platforms with compatible interfaces.

Variants

TRLG-230
The TRLG-230 has an additional seeker for laser guidance. It can hit targets marked by UAVs and UCAVs. Its CEP is down to less than two meters.

The range of the TRLG-230 was extended to 150 km, according to a July 2022 announcement.

TRG-230-İHA
An air-to-surface version of the TRG-230 missile was recently developed by Roketsan to be used in UCAVs. On 16 December 2022, officials shared the video of Bayraktar Akıncı successfully firing the TRG-230-İHA missile and hitting the target with precision from 100 kilometers away.

Operators 

Azerbaijani Land Forces: TRLG-230

Bangladesh Army: TRG-230

Ukrainian Ground Forces: TRLG-230

References

Roketsan products
Surface-to-surface missiles
Surface-to-surface missiles of Turkey
Self-propelled rocket launchers
Multiple rocket launchers
Self-propelled artillery of Turkey